Eridanos  or Eridanus was a river in Athens mentioned in Greek mythology and historiography.

Mythical stream 
Eridanus was the 'deep-swirling' river-god son of the Titans Oceanus and his sister-wife Tethys. He was the father of Zeuxippe, mother of the Argonauts Butes and Eribotes by Teleon.

Eridanus may be the same or different with his another river-god namesake.

Real river 
Eridanus was the small stream that flowed from a source in the foothills of the Lykabettos, through the Agora of ancient Athens in Greece to the archaeological site of the Kerameikos, where its bed is still visible. In this area lives a population of Greek tortoise.

Its course has been for the most part covered since ancient times, and was only visible outside the ancient walls in the district of Kerameikos.

The river was rediscovered during the excavations for the Athens Metro subway in the late 1990s, and its waters caused considerable technical problems at times. Because of the Metro works, its seasonal flow through the Kerameikos cemetery was disrupted, as the waters were apparently and inadvertently redirected to some new underground path.

As of April 2007, the stream of the river, as it flows through Monastiraki Square, has been excavated. It had been covered with a brickwork tunnel since classical times, and the brickwork had been repaired at least twice, in the imperial Roman and early Byzantine eras. The brick tunnel now forms part of a small open-air museum at Monastiraki Square, from Ermou to Ifaistou, next to the Metro station, and the waters of the Eridanos are from inside the tunnel.

Notes

References 
 Aken, Dr. A.R.A. van. (1961). Elseviers Mythologische Encyclopedie. Amsterdam: Elsevier.
 Bartelink, Dr. G.J.M. (1988). Prisma van de mythologie. Utrecht: Het Spectrum.
 Eridanos, the river of ancient Athens: Archaeological guide (in Greek and English) (Archaeological Receipts Fund). .
 Gaius Julius Hyginus, Fabulae from The Myths of Hyginus translated and edited by Mary Grant. University of Kansas Publications in Humanistic Studies. Online version at the Topos Text Project.
 Hesiod, Theogony from The Homeric Hymns and Homerica with an English Translation by Hugh G. Evelyn-White, Cambridge, MA.,Harvard University Press; London, William Heinemann Ltd. 1914. Online version at the Perseus Digital Library. Greek text available from the same website.

External link

Kerameikos
Geography of Athens
Rivers of Greece

Potamoi